The 2016 Girls' Youth South American Volleyball Championship was the 20th edition of the Girls' Youth South American Volleyball Championship, organised by South America's governing volleyball body, the Confederación Sudamericana de Voleibol (CSV).

Competing nations
The following national teams participated:

Preliminary round

Pool A

|}

|}

Pool B

|}

|}

Final round

5th–8th classification

5th–8th semifinals

|}

Seventh place match

|}

Fifth place match

|}

Championship

Semifinals

|}

Third place match

|}

Final

|}

Final standing

All-Star Team

Most Valuable Player

Best Outside Hitters

Best Setter

Best Middle Blockers

Best Opposite

Best Libero

References

2016
S
Volleyball
International volleyball competitions hosted by Peru